Mónica Quintela (born 1967) is a Portuguese politician. A member of the centre-right Social Democratic Party (PSD), Quintela was first elected to the Assembly of the Republic in 2019 as a representative of the Coimbra constituency.

Early life and education
Mónica Cláudia de Castro Quintela was born on 14 July 1967. She studied law at the University of Coimbra between 1986 and 1991.

Career
Quintela worked as a lawyer from 1994. She married Rui Manuel Portugal da Silva Leal, who is also a lawyer. Between 2014 and 2017 she was a member of the general council of the Portuguese Bar Association.

Political career
In 2019 Quintela was chosen to be head of the list of PSD candidates for the Coimbra constituency in the national election and was elected to be a deputy in the Assembly of the Republic. In the January 2022 national election, called by the Socialist Party prime minister, António Costa, following the failure of left-wing parties to support his budget, Quintela was again first on the PSD list for Coimbra and was duly re-elected. The PSD won three of the available nine seats for Coimbra.

During her first term in the Assembly, Quintela was vice-president of the parliamentary committee on the verification of elected deputies. In her re-election campaign she called for measures to improve birth rates in Portugal, such as improved maternity hospitals and more day-care centres. Criticising the country’s bureaucracy, she argued for more rapid digitalization of administrative functions. She also argued for a decentralization of government services.

References

Living people
1967 births
Social Democratic Party (Portugal) politicians
Members of the Assembly of the Republic (Portugal)
Women members of the Assembly of the Republic (Portugal)
University of Coimbra alumni
21st-century Portuguese politicians
21st-century Portuguese women politicians